Merri railway station is located on the Mernda line in Victoria, Australia. It serves the north-eastern Melbourne suburb of Northcote, and it opened on 8 October 1889 as Northcote. It was renamed Merri on 10 December 1906.

History

Merri station opened on 8 October 1889, when the Inner Circle line was extended from North Fitzroy to Reservoir. The original conception of the station was to act as a major junction in a planned "North Suburban Railway System". The Argus reported in 1887 that; "The Station at Union-street, as shown on our plan, must necessarily be the most important in the Northern System, as lines branch from this point to Preston and Whittlesea on the north ; Heidelberg, Kew, &.c., on the east; Carlton, Royal-park, North Melbourne, and Spencer-street on the south-west; Fitzroy, East Melbourne, and Flinders-street on the south; and if the alternative route is adopted, Clifton-hill, Collingwood, Richmond, and Flinders street on the south east.", while land sale plans advertised the upcoming construction of the "Grand Central Junction Station".

In 1910, the station building was rebuilt to accommodate an increased population in the area.

The nearby level crossing at Charles Street had hand-operated gates until 1924, when they were replaced with interlocked gates, operated from the nearby signal box, following several serious traffic accidents. In 1986, these gates were replaced with boom barriers. In 1987, the signal box was abolished.

In 1973, both platforms were extended at the Down end of the station.

During October 1987, the double line block system between Merri - Northcote was abolished, and replaced with three position signalling, with all two position signals between Merri and Thornbury also abolished.

Announced as part of a $21.9 million package in the 2022/23 Victorian State Budget, Merri, alongside other stations, will receive accessibility upgrades, the installation of CCTV, and platform shelters. The development process will begin in late 2022 or early 2023, with a timeline for the upgrades to be released once construction has begun.

Platforms and services
Merri has two side platforms. It is served by Mernda line trains.

Platform 1:
  all stations and limited express services to Flinders Street

Platform 2:
  all stations services to Mernda

Transport links

Moonee Valley Coaches operates one route via Merri station, under contract to Public Transport Victoria:
 : Moonee Ponds Junction – Westgarth station

Yarra Trams operates two routes via Merri station:
 : West Preston – Victoria Harbour (Docklands)
 : Bundoora RMIT – Waterfront City (Docklands)

Gallery

References

External links
 Melway map at street-directory.com.au

Railway stations in Melbourne
Railway stations in Australia opened in 1889
Railway stations in the City of Darebin